National Highway 347C, commonly referred to as NH 347C is a national highway in  India. It is a spur road of National Highway 47. NH-347C traverses the states of Madhya Pradesh and Maharashtra in India.

Route 

 Madhya Pradesh

Dhar, Gujri, Khalghat, Kasarwad, Khargaon, Bistan, Baner - Maharshtra border.

 Maharashtra

Madhya Pradesh border - Palpadlya, Raver - Madhya Pradesh border.

 Madhya Pradesh

Maharshtra border - Burhanpur.

Junctions  

  Terminal near Dhar.
  near Khalghat.
  near Khargone.
  Terminal near Burhanpur.

See also 

 List of National Highways in India
 List of National Highways in India by state

References

External links 

 NH 347C on OpenStreetMap

National highways in India
National Highways in Madhya Pradesh
National Highways in Maharashtra